Çetin Küçükarslan, better known by his stage name Çetin Alp (21 June 1947 – 18 May 2004), was a Turkish singer.

Life 
He was born in Malatya. Alp married three times, the first of which was to Ergül Kuğuoğlu. From this marriage he had twin daughters Fulya and Filiz (b. 1970) and son Ahmet (b. 1976). His second marriage was to Şermin Küçükaslan, from whom he divorced on 19 November 1982. His third marriage was to Suna Yıldızoğlu, which lasted for 9 years. The artist, who had a heart problem for a long time, had been angioed a few years before his death and had a stent placed in his heart, however, his treatment process was slow due to his lack of one kidney.

Career 
His career started in the 1970s with winning the competition Altın Ses. In these years, he released a Greek song that had been written by Sezen Cumhur Önal. The song became a hit, sold 500,000 copies, and earned him a golden certificate. He later released the song Son Defa Görsem, which became a hit as well. He later worked with Yurdaer Doğulu and Zekai Apaydın's orchestra, and following the Eurovision, he won third place at the 'World Singer Contest' in Los Angeles. He also won the first place in the 'Golden Orfe' competition held in Bulgaria in 1990. He continued his career together with his English ex-wife Suna Yıldızoğlu for nine years, and despite releasing many songs, he did not release a studio album. He represented Turkey together with Kısa Dalga Vocal Group at the Eurovision Song Contest 1983, performing the song "Opera". Alp was the target of devastating criticism for years due to his failure at the contest, after earning zero points and placing last., Turkey has its first victory in the contest in 2003, and the following year three days after the Eurovision Song Contest 2004 final in Istanbul, Alp lost his life due to heart attack. A week prior, in an interview with TRT on the occasion of Eurovision 2004, he explained that "the sad results he received in Munich made him very upset and he had not recovered for years".

 Discography 
 Songs Topkapı Plak Sen Bir Yana, Dünya Bir Yana / Herşeyi Unutalım
 Günah Bize / Meçhul Karanlık (1970)
 Ayrılık Yok Artık / Bir Gün Biter Demiştin (1972)Yonca Plak Bir Kadeh Atınca Birşeyin Kalmaz / Hatıralar (1973)Öncü Plak Çek Çek / Sana Ne Olmuş (1978)
 Elveda (1979 Eurovision Finale Katılan Şarkı) / Son Defa Görsem (1979)
 Son Olsun / Sonsuz Aşk (Suna Yıldızoğlu ile) (1981)Diskotür Plak'
 Opera (Türkçe) / Opera (İngilizce) (1983)

Other 
 Son Defa (1986 Kuşadası Golden Pigeon Music Competition)

References 

1947 births
Turkish pop singers
20th-century Turkish male singers
Eurovision Song Contest entrants of 1983
Eurovision Song Contest entrants for Turkey
People from Malatya
2004 deaths
Burials at Feriköy Cemetery